Juan Antonio Rodríguez may refer to:
 Juan Antonio Rodríguez (tennis) (born 1962), Spanish tennis player
 Chi-Chi Rodríguez (born 1935), Puerto Rican golfer
 Juan Antonio Rodríguez Duflox (born 1937), Spanish footballer
 Juan Antonio Rodríguez Villamuela (born 1982), Spanish footballer

See also 
 Juan Rodríguez (disambiguation)